The 2004–05 Copa del Rey was the 103rd staging of the Copa del Rey.

The competition started on 1 September 2004 and concluded on 1 June 2005 with the Final, held at the Estadio Vicente Calderón in Madrid, in which Real Betis lifted the trophy for the first time since 1977 with a 2–1 victory over CA Osasuna.

First round 

|}

Round of 64

Round of 32

Knock-out rounds

Round of 16 

|}

First leg

Second leg

Quarter-finals 

|}

First leg

Second leg

Semi-finals 

|}

First leg

Second leg

Final

Top goalscorers

References

External links 

  RSSSF
  Linguasport

Copa del Rey seasons
1